The 1973 Pacific typhoon season has no official bounds; it ran year-round in 1973, but most tropical cyclones tend to form in the northwestern Pacific Ocean between June and December. These dates conventionally delimit the period of each year when most tropical cyclones form in the northwestern Pacific Ocean.

The scope of this article is limited to the Pacific Ocean, north of the equator and west of the international date line. Storms that form east of the date line and north of the equator are called hurricanes; see 1973 Pacific hurricane season. Tropical Storms formed in the entire west pacific basin were assigned a name by the Joint Typhoon Warning Center. Tropical depressions in this basin have the "W" suffix added to their number. Tropical depressions that enter or form in the Philippine area of responsibility are assigned a name by the Philippine Atmospheric, Geophysical and Astronomical Services Administration or PAGASA. This can often result in the same storm having two names.

Season summary

Systems 
25 tropical depressions formed this year in the Western Pacific, of which 21 became tropical storms. 12 storms reached typhoon intensity, of which 3 reached super typhoon strength.

Severe Tropical Storm Wilda (Atring) 

Tropical Storm Wilda formed as a disturbance east of the Philippines. It traveled northwest and became a tropical depression as it made landfall on Luzon on June 30th. It crossed the island, and became a tropical storm as it entered the South China Sea on the 1st of July. It traveled north and made landfall in southern China on the 3rd. The remnants of Wilda dissipated inland a few days later.

Typhoon Anita

Typhoon Billie (Bining) 

Tropical Storm Billie, which developed on July 12 east of the Philippines, rapidly strengthened on the 14th and 15th to a 150 mph super typhoon. It tracked due north, fluctuating in intensity for the next 3 days. A building ridge over the Sea of Japan forced Billie to the northwest, where it weakened greatly, first to a tropical storm on the 18th, then to a tropical depression on the 19th as it passed over northeastern China. The storm dissipated on the 20th.

Typhoon Dot 

Typhoon Dot struck Hong Kong causing sustained storm force winds, killing one person.

Severe Tropical Storm Clara

Typhoon Ellen

Tropical Storm Fran (Kuring)

Typhoon Georgia

Typhoon Iris (Daling)

Tropical Storm Hope

Tropical Depression 11W

Tropical Storm Joan (Elang)

Severe Tropical Storm Kate (Goring)

Tropical Depression 14W

Typhoon Louise (Huling)

Typhoon Marge (Ibiang) 

Hainan, Qionghai Jiaji town recorded a minimum central pressure of 937.8 hPa when Marge landfall. Marge killed 903 people in Hainan.
Marge made its final landfall in Thanh Hoa, Vietnam on September 15.

Typhoon Nora (Luming) 

The monsoon trough spawned a tropical depression east of the Philippines on October 1. Under weak steering currents, it meandered westward, where favorable conditions allowed for it to strengthen, first to a tropical storm on the 2nd, then to a typhoon on the 3rd. Nora continued to the northwest, and explosively deepened on the 5th and 6th to a 185 mph super typhoon. At the time, it had a minimum central pressure of 875 millibars, the lowest pressure on record at the time and currently tied for 9th. The typhoon weakened as it headed to the northwest, and struck northeastern Luzon on the 7th as a 115 mph typhoon. Nora continued to the northwest, weakening to a minimal typhoon as it hit southeast China on the 10th. The typhoon caused 18 fatalities, with over $2 million in damage.

Typhoon Opal

Typhoon Patsy (Miling)

Typhoon Ruth (Narsing) 

27 people were killed when Typhoon Ruth crossed Luzon on October 15 and caused $5 million in damage. Ruth continued to the northwest, and hit Hainan Island and Quang Ninh, Vietnam on the 19th, respectively.

Severe Tropical Storm Sarah 

On November 12 this system emerged in the Bay of Bengal and became Tropical Cyclone 37-73.

Severe Tropical Storm Thelma

Severe Tropical Storm Vera (Openg) 

One of the strongest tropical cyclones to hit Visayas when it entered on November 20, although the system didn't reach typhoon status. Tropical Storm Openg affected around 3.4 million people.

Storm names 
Western North Pacific tropical cyclones were named by the Joint Typhoon Warning Center. The first storm of 1973 was named Wilda and the final one was named Vera.

Philippines 

The Philippine Atmospheric, Geophysical and Astronomical Services Administration uses its own naming scheme for tropical cyclones in their area of responsibility. PAGASA assigns names to tropical depressions that form within their area of responsibility and any tropical cyclone that might move into their area of responsibility. Should the list of names for a given year prove to be insufficient, names are taken from an auxiliary list, the first 10 of which are published each year before the season starts. This is the same list used for the 1969 season. PAGASA uses its own naming scheme that starts in the Filipino alphabet, with names of Filipino female names ending with "ng" (A, B, K, D, etc.).

Season effects 
This table will list all the storms that developed in the northwestern Pacific Ocean west of the International Date Line and north of the equator during 1973. It will include their intensity, duration, name, areas affected, deaths, missing persons (in parentheses), and damage totals. Classification and intensity values will be based on estimations conducted by the JMA, however due to lack of information around this time sustained winds were recorded by the JTWC. All damage figures will be in 1973 USD. Damages and deaths from a storm will include when the storm was a precursor wave or an extratropical low.

|-
| TD ||  || bgcolor=#| || bgcolor=#| || bgcolor=#| || South China ||  None ||  None ||
|-
| Wilda (Atring) ||  || bgcolor=#| || bgcolor=#| || bgcolor=#| || Philippines, China ||  Unknown ||  Unknown ||
|-
| Anita ||  || bgcolor=#| || bgcolor=#| || bgcolor=#| || Vietnam, Thailand ||  Unknown ||  Unknown ||
|-
| Billie (Bining) ||  || bgcolor=#| || bgcolor=#| || bgcolor=#| || Philippines, Ryukyu Islands, China ||  Unknown ||  Unknown ||
|-
| Dot ||  || bgcolor=#| || bgcolor=#| || bgcolor=#| || China, Ryukyu Islands, Korean Peninsula ||  Unknown ||  ||
|-
| Clara ||  || bgcolor=#| || bgcolor=#| || bgcolor=#| || None ||  None ||  None ||
|-
| Ellen ||  || bgcolor=#| || bgcolor=#| || bgcolor=#| || Japan ||  None ||  None ||
|-
| TD ||  || bgcolor=#| || bgcolor=#| || bgcolor=#| || Mariana Islands ||  None ||  None ||
|-
| Fran (Kuring) ||  || bgcolor=#| || bgcolor=#| || bgcolor=#| || Philippines ||  None ||  None ||
|-
| Georgia ||  || bgcolor=#| || bgcolor=#| || bgcolor=#| || China ||  Unknown ||  Unknown ||
|-
| TD ||  || bgcolor=#| || bgcolor=#| || bgcolor=#| || Philippines ||  None ||  None ||
|-
| Iris (Daling) ||  || bgcolor=#| || bgcolor=#| || bgcolor=#| || Ryukyu Islands, Korean Peninsula ||  Unknown ||  Unknown ||
|-
| Hope ||  || bgcolor=#| || bgcolor=#| || bgcolor=#| || None ||  None ||  None ||
|-
| 11W ||  || bgcolor=#| || bgcolor=#| || bgcolor=#| || None ||  None ||  None ||
|-
| TD ||  || bgcolor=#| || bgcolor=#| || bgcolor=#| || Philippines ||  None ||  None ||
|-
| Joan (Elang) ||  || bgcolor=#| || bgcolor=#| || bgcolor=#| || Philippines, Taiwan, China ||  None ||  None ||
|-
| TD ||  || bgcolor=#| || bgcolor=#| || bgcolor=#| || Taiwan ||  None ||  None ||
|-
| Kate (Goring) ||  || bgcolor=#| || bgcolor=#| || bgcolor=#| || Philippines, South China, Vietnam ||  Unknown ||  Unknown ||
|-
| TD ||  || bgcolor=#| || bgcolor=#| || bgcolor=#| || Taiwan, Ryukyu Islands, China ||  None ||  None ||
|-
| 14W ||  || bgcolor=#| || bgcolor=#| || bgcolor=#| || South China, Vietnam ||  None ||  None ||
|-
| Louise (Huling) ||  || bgcolor=#| || bgcolor=#| || bgcolor=#| || Philippines, South China ||  Unknown ||  Unknown ||
|-
| TD ||  || bgcolor=#| || bgcolor=#| || bgcolor=#| || None ||  None ||  None ||
|-
| Marge (Ibiang) ||  || bgcolor=#| || bgcolor=#| || bgcolor=#| || Philippines, South China ||  Unknown ||  ||
|-
| TD ||  || bgcolor=#| || bgcolor=#| || bgcolor=#| || None ||  None ||  None ||
|-
| Nora (Luming) ||  || bgcolor=#| || bgcolor=#| || bgcolor=#| || Philippines, South China ||  ||  ||
|-
| Opal ||  || bgcolor=#| || bgcolor=#| || bgcolor=#| || Vietnam, Cambodia, Laos ||  Unknown ||  Unknown ||
|-
| Patsy (Miling) ||  || bgcolor=#| || bgcolor=#| || bgcolor=#| || Philippines, Vietnam ||  Unknown ||  Unknown ||
|-
| TD ||  || bgcolor=#| || bgcolor=#| || bgcolor=#| || None ||  None ||  None ||
|-
| Ruth (Narsing) ||  || bgcolor=#| || bgcolor=#| || bgcolor=#| || Caroline Islands, Philippines, South China ||  ||  ||
|-
| TD ||  || bgcolor=#| || bgcolor=#| || bgcolor=#| || Vietnam ||  None ||  None ||
|-
| TD ||  || bgcolor=#| || bgcolor=#| || bgcolor=#| || Mariana Islands ||  None ||  None ||
|-
| TD ||  || bgcolor=#| || bgcolor=#| || bgcolor=#| || None ||  None ||  None ||
|-
| TD ||  || bgcolor=#| || bgcolor=#| || bgcolor=#| || Palau ||  None ||  None ||
|-
| TD ||  || bgcolor=#| || bgcolor=#| || bgcolor=#| || None ||  None ||  None ||
|-
| Sarah ||  || bgcolor=#| || bgcolor=#| || bgcolor=#| || Vietnam, Cambodia, Thailand ||  Unknown ||  Unknown ||
|-
| Thelma ||  || bgcolor=#| || bgcolor=#| || bgcolor=#| || Philippines, Vietnam, Thailand ||  Unknown ||  Unknown ||
|-
| Vera (Openg) ||  || bgcolor=#| || bgcolor=#| || bgcolor=#| || Philippines ||  Unknown ||  Unknown ||
|-
| TD ||  || bgcolor=#| || bgcolor=#| || bgcolor=#| || Malaysia ||  None ||  None ||
|-
| TD ||  || bgcolor=#| || bgcolor=#| || bgcolor=#| || Philippines ||  None ||  None ||
|-

See also 

 1973 Pacific hurricane season
 1973 Atlantic hurricane season
 1973 North Indian Ocean cyclone season
 Australian cyclone seasons: 1972–73, 1973–74
 South Pacific cyclone seasons: 1972–73, 1973–74
 South-West Indian Ocean cyclone seasons: 1972–73, 1973–74

References

External links 
 Japan Meteorological Agency
 Joint Typhoon Warning Center .
 China Meteorological Agency
 National Weather Service Guam
 Hong Kong Observatory
 Macau Meteorological Geophysical Services
 Korea Meteorological Agency
 Philippine Atmospheric, Geophysical and Astronomical Services Administration
 Taiwan Central Weather Bureau
 Digital Typhoon - Typhoon Images and Information
 Typhoon2000 Philippine typhoon website